

Predicted and scheduled events 
 May – The 2028 Eurovision Song Contest is scheduled; the location is typically determined by the previous year's winner.
 July 14 – July 30 – The 2028 Summer Olympics will be held in Los Angeles, California, US.

 November 7 – The 2028 United States presidential election will be held.

Date unknown
 The African Monetary Union is scheduled to be established, bringing a common currency to the members of the African Union.
 Lease on the Moldauhafen port lot in Hamburg, Germany, to the Czech Republic is set to expire.

References 

 
Leap years in the Gregorian calendar